Gold-Burg Independent School District is a public school district in northwestern Montague County, Texas (USA). A small portion of the district extends into northeastern Clay County.

The district's name is a conglomerate of the two unincorporated communities that it serves – "Gold" from Ringgold and "Burg" from Stoneburg.

In 2009, the school district was rated "academically acceptable" by the Texas Education Agency.

Schools
Gold-Burg Junior High/High School  (Grades K–12; Located in Stoneburg)

Special programs

Athletics
Gold-Burg High School plays six-man football.

See also

List of school districts in Texas

References

External links
Gold-Burg ISD

School districts in Montague County, Texas
School districts in Clay County, Texas